The 1970 All-Ireland Senior Football Championship was the 84th staging of the All-Ireland Senior Football Championship, the Gaelic Athletic Association's premier inter-county Gaelic football tournament. The championship began on 10 May 1970 and ended on 27 September 1970.

Kerry entered the championship as the defending champions.

On 27 September 1970, Kerry won the championship following a 2-19 to 0-18 defeat of Meath in the All-Ireland final. This was their 22nd All-Ireland title, their second in succession.

Meath's Tony Brennan was the championship's top scorer with 0-33. Kerry's Tom Prendergast was the choice for Texaco Footballer of the Year.

Rule change

As a result of a decision taken at the Gaelic Athletic Association's (GAA) annual congress the previous year, as of 1970 all provincial finals, All-Ireland semi-finals and the All-Ireland final itself were extended to 80 minutes playing time.  Prior to this all championship matches were sixty minutes in duration.

Leinster Championship format change

The Second Round dropped from the Leinster football championship this year.

Results

Connacht Senior Football Championship

Quarter-final

Semi-finals

Final

Leinster Senior Football Championship

First round

   
  

Quarter-finals

 
 
 

Semi-finals

 
 

Final

Munster Senior Football Championship

Quarter-finals

Semi-finals

 

Final

Ulster Senior Football Championship

Preliminary round

Quarter-finals

 

 

Semi-finals

 

Final

All-Ireland Senior Football Championship

Semi-finals

Final

Championship statistics

Miscellaneous

 On 12 July 1970, the Connacht final between Galway and Roscommon becomes the first championship game to be played over the course of 80 minutes.
 Kerry win their 5th 2 in a row as All Ireland Champions.

Top scorers

Overall

Single game

References